Bella Vista Department is a  department of Corrientes Province in Argentina.

External links
Bella Vista website 

Departments of Corrientes Province